Orangeburg Downtown Historic District is a national historic district located at Orangeburg, Orangeburg County, South Carolina. The district encompasses 44 contributing buildings in the central business district of Orangeburg. It includes a variety of commercial, industrial, and governmental buildings built between about 1883 and 1925.  Notable buildings include St. Paul's Methodist Church, U. S. Post Office, Blythewood Building, Orangeburg City Hall, and Fire Department Headquarters.

It was added to the National Register of Historic Places in 1985.

Additional documentation for the historic district was approved by the National Register on January 22, 2019.

References

Historic districts on the National Register of Historic Places in South Carolina
Romanesque Revival architecture in South Carolina
Buildings and structures in Orangeburg County, South Carolina
National Register of Historic Places in Orangeburg County, South Carolina